The Fisichella family is an Italian noble family that forms part of the Sicilian nobility.

Fisichella may also refer to:

  (born 1841), priest and philosopher
 Domenico Fisichella (born 1935), politician and professor 
 Salvatore Fisichella (born 1943), operatic tenor
 Rino Fisichella (born 1951), theologian and archbishop
 Giancarlo Fisichella (born 1973), racing driver

See also 
 Fisichella (surname)
 Fisichella Motor Sport